Operation Lumberjack was a military operation with the goal of capturing the west bank of the Rhine River and seizing key German cities, near the end of World War II. The First United States Army launched the operation in March 1945 to capture strategic cities in Nazi Germany  and to give the Allies a foothold along the Rhine.

One unexpected outcome was the capture of the Ludendorff bridge, a strategic railroad bridge across the Rhine, in the Battle of Remagen. Despite German attempts to destroy the bridge, Allied forces captured it intact and were able to use it for ten days to establish a bridgehead on the far side, before it finally collapsed at 3:00 PM on 17 March 1945 after ten days of aircraft bombing, direct artillery hits, near misses, and demolition attempts.

Background 
The Germans had repeatedly frustrated Allied efforts to cross the Rhine. With the 21st Army Group firmly established along the Rhine, U.S. General of the Army Omar Bradley's 12th Army Group prepared to execute Operation Lumberjack. Bradley's plan called for the U.S. First Army to attack southeastward toward the juncture of the Ahr and Rhine Rivers and then swing south to meet Lieutenant General George Patton, whose U. S. Third Army would simultaneously drive northeastward through the Eifel. If successful, Lumberjack would capture Cologne, secure the Koblenz sector, and bring the 12th Army Group to the Rhine in the entire area north of the Moselle River. The 12th Army Group also hoped to capture a large number of Germans.

Following Lumberjack, the Allies had planned for a pause along the Rhine while Montgomery's 21st Army Group began Operation Plunder, a large, carefully planned movement across the Rhine near Düsseldorf and the Dutch border. Montgomery would then capture the Ruhr, the industrial heartland of Germany.

Allied forces 

During the operation, the U.S. First Army controlled   
III Corps (Major General John Millikin), 
 9th Armored Division,
 1st Infantry Division, 
 9th Infantry Division,
 78th Infantry Division
V Corps (Major General Clarence R. Huebner),
 2nd Infantry Division, 
 28th Infantry Division, 
 69th Infantry Division, 
 106th Infantry Division 
 7th Armored Division (not committed to the operation and transferred to the III Corps by March 7).
VII Corps (Major General J. Lawton Collins), 
 3rd Armored Division
 8th Infantry Division, 
 99th Infantry Division, 
 104th Infantry Division.

During Operation Lumberjack, the U.S. Army's 9th Armored Division was tasked with mopping up elements of the German Army trapped on the west bank of the Rhine and to prevent a counterattack against the Ninth Army's flank. They were to secure the region between Mosel and the Duren-Cologne and to destroy the German army's capability to fight in that area. The First Army was to seize the entire region west of the Rhine. After capturing Cologne, the First Army was to wheel southeast and join up with Patton's Third Army. Patton was supposed to capture the Eifel Mountains and then the Mosel Valley, trapping the remainder of the German Seventh Army in the Eifel area.

German forces 
From north to south, the attacking U.S. forces were confronted by
 German Fifteenth Army (General der Infanterie Gustav-Adolf von Zangen),
 LXXXI Corps (Friedrich Köchling, from March 10 Ernst-Günther Baade)
9th Panzer Division
11th Panzer Division 
363rd Infantry Division  
59th Infantry Division 
Divisionsstab 476
LVIII Panzer Corps (Walter Krüger)
353rd Infantry Division  
12th Infantry Division 
3rd Panzergrenadier Division 
German Fifth Panzer Army (General der Panzertruppe Hasso von Manteuffel, from March 9 Generaloberst Josef Harpe)
LXXIV Corps  (Carl Püchler)
85th Infantry Division  
272nd Infantry Division 
3rd Airborne Division 
LXVII Corps (Otto Hitzfeld)
89th Infantry Division 
277th Infantry Division 
LXVI Corps  (Walther Lucht)
 5th Airborne Division.

Over 75,000 German troops were on the western banks of the bridge. Their only escape route was across the Ludendorff bridge.

Written permission was required to destroy the bridge because on 14–15 October 1944, an American bomb had struck the Mulheim Bridge in Cologne and hit the chamber containing the demolition charges, prematurely destroying the bridge. Hitler was angered by this incident and ordered those "responsible" for the destruction of the Mulheim Bridge to be court-martialed. He also ordered that demolition explosives should not be laid in place until the very last moment, when the Allies were within  of the bridge. The bridges should only be demolished following an order in writing from the officer in charge, and only as a last resort and at the last possible moment. This order left officers responsible for destroying bridges nervous about both the consequences if they blew up the bridge too soon and if they failed to blow it up at all.

Battle 

Bradley launched Lumberjack on 1 March. In the north, the First Army rapidly exploited bridgeheads over the Erft River, entering Euskirchen on 4 March and Cologne on the fifth. Cologne was in U.S. Army control by the seventh. The First Army then pushed towards the Ahr River valley, the likely point of retreat for what was left of the German Army's LXVI and LXVII Korps.

The U.S. Third Army met some resistance along the Siegfried Line and the Prüm and Kyll Rivers. On 4 March at Bitburg, the 5th Infantry Division cut through the German lines. Taking advantage of the breach, the Fourth Armored Division struck out on a  drive to the Rhine in less than five days. While losing only 100 casualties, they cost the Germans 5,700 killed and wounded. The Fourth Armored barely missed the chance to capture a bridge at Urmitz.

While moving towards the Ahr, the U.S. 9th Armored Division on the right flank of the First Army had moved swiftly towards the Rhine. The closer the division got to the Rhine, the more quickly it advanced. The speed of their movement towards the Rhine surprised the Germans.

Battle of Remagen 

During Operation Lumberjack, on 7 March 1945, when troops of the U.S. Army's 9th Armored Division Combat Command B, 9th Armored Engineer Battalion reached the river, they were very surprised to see that the railroad bridge was still standing. It was one of the two damaged but usable bridges over the Rhine (the other being the Wesel Railway Bridge). U.S. forces were able to capture the bridge. The Rhine was the last natural line of defense that the Germans hoped could be used to substantially resist the Western Allied advance. Up to then, crossings had been limited to small infantry reconnaissance patrols by boat.

When word that the bridge was still standing reached General William Hoge, commander of Combat Command B, he ordered the 27th Armored Infantry Battalion to advance into Remagen with support from the 14th Tank Battalion. After German demolition charges failed to destroy the bridge, the U.S. troops captured the bridge and in the next ten days 25,000 troops comprising six divisions established a wide beachhead on the eastern side of the Rhine.

Impact on war plans 
The capture of the bridge convinced the Allied high command in Western Europe that they could envelop the German industrial area of the Ruhr as opposed to focusing primarily on General Bernard Montgomery's plan, Operation Plunder, which would bring the British 21st Army Group across the Rhine into northern Germany.

The unexpected availability of the first major crossing of the Rhine, Germany's last major natural barrier and line of defense, caused Allied high commander Dwight Eisenhower to alter his plans to end the war. The ability to quickly establish a bridgehead on the eastern side of the Rhine and to get forces into Germany allowed the U.S. forces to envelop the German industrial area of the Ruhr. The Allies were able to get six divisions across the Rhine before the Ludendorff Bridge collapsed ten days after it was captured on 17 March. Twenty-five soldiers were killed or went missing and three died later from injuries; 63 others were injured.

The bridge was not rebuilt after the war. However, the bridge towers remain and in 1980 a peace museum was opened to the public.

Aftermath 
Operation Lumberjack succeeded in clearing the Rhine north of Mosel of effective German forces. The Allies destroyed four corps of the German 15th and 7th Armies. The capture of the bridge at Remagen was an unexpected bonus that advanced the timetable for crossing the Rhine. Patton and Bradley were able to move up their scheduled crossings of the Rhine.

General Albert Kesselring described the battle as the "Crime of Remagen. It broke the front along the Rhine." Hermann Göring said that the capture of the bridge "made a long defense impossible." Major General Carl Wagener, chief of staff to Field Marshall Walter Model, said that capturing the bridge signaled the end of the war for the Germans:

In popular culture 
The battle was depicted in the novel The Bridge at Remagen by Ken Hechler, which was later adapted into the film of the same name.

See also 
 Operation Veritable
 Operation Grenade
 Operation Undertone
 Remagen

References

Other sources 
 Charles MacDonald, The Last Offensive, Washington: GPO, 1973.
 Georg Tessin, Verbände und Truppen der deutschen Wehrmacht and Waffen-SS 1939 - 1945, Volume 2, Osnabrück:Biblio Verlag, 1973.
 Georg Tessin, Verbände und Truppen der deutschen Wehrmacht and Waffen-SS 1939 - 1945, Volume 4, Osnabrück:Biblio Verlag, 1975.

Further reading

External links 
 The Rhineland Campaign
 MacDonald's The Last Offensive online at www.ibiblio.org
 Map of Operation Lumberjack - 

Military operations of World War II involving Germany
Western European Campaign (1944–1945)
Battles and operations of World War II involving the United States
March 1945 events